Breaking news, interchangeably termed late-breaking news and also known as a special report or special coverage or news flash, is a current issue that broadcasters feel warrants the interruption of scheduled programming or current news in order to report its details. Its use is also assigned to the most significant story of the moment or a story that is being covered live. It could be a story that is simply of wide interest to viewers and has little impact otherwise. Many times, breaking news is used after the news organization has already reported on the story. When a story has not been reported on previously, the graphic and phrase "Just In" is sometimes used instead.

Formats

Television
The format of a special report or breaking news event on broadcast television commonly consists of the following: When a news event warrants an interruption of current non-news programming (or, in some cases, regularly scheduled newscasts), the broadcaster will usually alert all of its affiliates via an internal alert/message service telling them to stand by for the interruption. After some time, the network's feed will suddenly switch to a reverse countdown, usually from 5 seconds, to allow any affiliated stations to switch to the network feed (television stations typically do not provide these countdowns for local coverage, merely leading with a graphic and voiceover announcing the cut-in). If a national network newscast is in progress when the breaking news event occurs, the newscast will pause temporarily to allow other network affiliates to join the feed. There is then an opening graphic, featuring music (such as NBC's "The Pulse of Events", composed by John Williams) which adds an emphasis on the importance of the event. The open is followed by the introduction of a news anchor, who welcomes the viewer to the broadcast and introduces the story at hand. Lower thirds and other graphics may also be altered to convey a sense of urgency.

Once the story is introduced, the network or local station may, if possible, choose to continue to show a live shot of the anchor or may cut away to video or images of the story that is being followed during the broadcast. Additionally, the coverage may be passed to a reporter at the location of the breaking event, possibly sharing more information about the story as it breaks.

Depending on the story being followed, the report may last only a few minutes, or continue for multiple hours – or with the longest uninterrupted news events, for days at a time –(events in which the latter instances has occurred include the assassination of John F. Kennedy and the September 11 attacks, which took place between November 22–26, 1963 and September 11–15, 2001, respectively). If coverage continues for an extended amount of time, the network may integrate analysis about the story through analysts in-studio, via phone, satellite, broadband (B-GAN) or through other means of communication. Depending on the severity of the event, regular commercial advertising may be suspended entirely for sustained coverage. Network affiliates will be required to insert their station identification in at the top of the hour overlaid during the report rather than through the usual means of a station imaging promo or program reminder.

If a story occurs during the early fringe timeslot and depending on the magnitude of the events at hand, local stations might be given the opportunity to break away from the network feed and begin their evening newscasts. This is set up by a cue from the network's talent that they will pause for a few seconds to reset coverage, at which point an opening graphic may be rolled again. Information is also disseminated from an internal alert service utilized by a station's master control. After the local newscast, stations will likely return to the network's feed as they normally would for the network newscast, but they may be joining in on an "extended edition." Whether or not a station will take over for local news is usually the choice of that station's news director.

When the coverage comes to a close, the network or station may either resume programming that was occurring before the event or begin new programming (if the breaking news happens during a newscast the network will switch back to the newscast upon completion if time permits), depending upon the amount of time spent on the coverage. The outro usually includes a promo directing viewers to the network's website (or that of the station, if coverage is provided locally) and other platforms (including television and streaming news channels) for continued coverage  If the story breaks during daytime or late-night programming, the anchor will usually remind viewers that there will be or might be more details on their local news that day and a full wrap-up on the network's evening or morning news program if applicable. In most cases, regular daytime and late-night programming is re-joined in progress, and segments may be missed (although sister stations and digital subchannels can provide an alternate outlet for programming pre-empted due to a special report).

If the event occurs during prime time, the anchor will usually remind viewers that there will be more details on their late local newscast and on the network's overnight news program (if applicable) the next morning. Programming at this time is either joined in progress or started back up at the point of the interruption, depending on whether the program is new to air, highly rated, or has time left in its time slot to finish airing. For instance, ABC's breaking news report involving the April 2017 Shayrat missile strike took into account a new episode of the series Scandal, where the show was resumed right at the point of interruption twice in the Eastern and Central time zones for those reports. NBC's coverage featured the low-rated The Blacklist: Redemption in the Eastern and Central time zones joined in the middle of an episode in progress after their special report without any of that consideration. In either of the above instances, network (and in some cases, for local stations, syndicated) programs that have segments not aired or are pre-empted in their entirety by breaking news reports – particularly those that extend to or longer than 20 or 45 minutes, depending on the length of the previously scheduled program – may have to be rescheduled to air at a later time.

While most news events warrant interruption with little warning, certain anticipated events allow networks to schedule pre-emptions of regular programming days and sometimes weeks in advance—including scheduled speeches by political leaders, and elections (including candidates' debates,  election night coverage, and the formal inaugurations of their winners).

Talking heads
Breaking news reports often face the same problems in reporting: no footage of the incident, no reporters at the scene, and little available information. To be able to report on current affairs despite this, many networks either employ full-time (typical in the United States) or contact freelance (typical in the United Kingdom) experts and pundits to be "talking heads". These people have either experience or expertise and are considered reliable by the general public. They have been common on television, and can also appear on radio.

In the United States, the competitive nature of commercial networks has allowed for pundits to develop their skills and dedicate themselves to respond to breaking news with analysis in a variety of fields, most often political. These talking heads can be paid millions to work exclusively for a network. In the United Kingdom, TV talking heads are sometimes considered filler who talk around the subject. They are not full-time employees of networks and are not always paid – when they are it is a flat fee for the slot – and will be urgently called in to discuss the relevant field (in which they will typically work full-time). Pundits in the UK have said that they do it because they deem it important to get expert coverage of breaking news, and because it can put their field (and themselves) in the spotlight. Research has suggested that talking heads in the United States are more likely to be partial than talking heads in the United Kingdom.

In 2015, the Financial Times suggested that with modern technological developments broadening news coverage, and with networks opting to show "livelier" non-expert comments from social media more, the need for talking heads may be shrinking.

Radio
On radio, the process of a breaking news story is somewhat the same, though some different considerations are made for the medium. For instance, a breaking news theme is required by default to have an urgent tenor and be used only for the purpose of true breaking news or bulletins. This is obvious on the local all-news radio stations owned by Audacy (formerly owned by CBS Radio), which very rarely use a breaking news theme for all but the most urgent and dire of breaking news, and is purposefully structured to give a sense of attention for the listener, almost sounding like an alarm. For local events, continuous coverage may be imposed, or else the station may wait until they have a reporter at the scene and will promise more details of the event as they become available.

National news that is broadcast over a radio network requires constant monitoring by station employees to allow the network coverage to air, although many stations will take the 'urgent' signal sent by the network (often sent within the digital stream of the network and inaudible to the listener, like ratings identifications) and break into programming immediately. Again, continuous coverage from a national radio network depends on the severity of the event, and often the network may just pass down the coverage by their local affiliate with spare commentary by the network's anchors. In the United Kingdom, Independent Radio News provides special alarm systems specifically to notify its affiliates of deaths in the British royal family, mandating their participation in heavily-coordinated mourning protocols that are practiced by the government and broadcasters.

Other considerations are made; FM music stations rarely relay breaking news unless it is an event of grave national concern, though local weather warnings are relayed when in effect (either in the form of updates provided by an on-staff anchor, a disc jockey, or the on-air staffer handing all station operations in an overnight period, an emergency alert system or through an audio simulcast of a television station which maintains a contractual partnership with a radio outlet). Less urgent events allow a network to feed updates to stations at :20, :30 and :50 minutes after the hour to give a summary of events. Stations are also careful about what stories are relayed during play-by-play broadcasts of professional and college sports, as those are the programs most listened to on the radio, so there, breaking news coverage is often limited to only commercial breaks or a promise of 'details later' after the event, within a station identification.

Usage
Instant news became possible with the invention of the telegraph in the 1840s. The completion of the Transcontinental Railroad in 1869 is an example of this.

News bulletins have been a fixture of radio broadcasting since at least the 1920s. Examples of early news bulletins  in the Golden Age of Radio include fictionalized versions in the 1938 radio drama The War of the Worlds and coverage of the attack on Pearl Harbor, which was also the first television news bulletin, reported on stations in New York and Pennsylvania. KTLA in Los Angeles is credited with being the first television station to provide extended coverage of a breaking news event: for 27½ hours from April 8 to 9, 1949, the station carried live coverage of an attempt to rescue three-year-old Kathy Fiscus, who had fallen down an abandoned well in San Marino, California, where she ultimately perished due to asphyxia from a lack of oxygen.

In the decades before 24-hour news networks such as CNN began to exist, programming interruptions were restricted to extremely urgent news, such as the death of an important political figure. For example, one of the earliest such interruptions that modern viewers would recognize as "breaking news" coverage was for the assassination of U.S. President John F. Kennedy in 1963, (with CBS News anchorman Walter Cronkite's coverage being especially noted), and as such reflected the relatively crude technology and procedures of that era. Such breaks are now common at 24-hour news channels, which may have an anchor available for live interruption at any time. Some networks, such as Sky News, largely emphasize this, even advertising the station/network as being " first for breaking news".

Another type of breaking news is that of severe weather events, which had such coverage evolve in a very similar manner. In North America until the 1990s, television and radio stations normally only provided long-form weather coverage during immediate, ongoing threats (such as a tornado that has been confirmed visually or by radar to be producing damage or a landfalling hurricane); cut-ins and, in the case of television stations, alert crawls during regular programming were used otherwise, even when higher-end alerts such as tornado warnings were issued. Advancements in newsgathering and weather technology (including the deployment of helicopters to provide aerial coverage and radar systems that can detect specific storm attributes), coupled with a few highly life-threatening events during the 1990s (such as Hurricane Andrew and the 1999 Oklahoma tornado outbreak) and the resulting heightened urgency to advise those in the storm's path to take safety precautions in advance made extended (or "wall-to-wall") weather coverage once a high-end alert is issued more common in storm-prone areas, with cut-ins only being used in weather events of lesser severity.

In various countries and at various news outlets, terms such as "(late)breaking", "urgent", "flash", "bulletin", and "alert" may accompany breaking news reports. The term breaking news has come to replace the older use of news bulletin, with the latter term relegated to only the most extraordinary of events. There has been widespread use of breaking news at the local level, particularly when one station in a market wants to emphasize the exclusivity of coverage. Not all viewers agree that stories assigned as breaking news rise to the significance or level of interest that warrant such a designation. CNN chairman and CEO Chris Licht wrote upon assuming the position in 2022, "It has become such a fixture on every channel and network that its impact has become lost on the audience." To address this, he began limiting CNN's use of the term only to stories of utmost importance.

American network news divisions still use the term special report for either a breaking news, a developing news story or both, but tend to use the term breaking news on their morning and evening news programs. Most local stations across the United States that interrupt regular programming for a news story use the breaking news and special report terms (though, local broadcast news outlets use the former most often), with a voice-over stating either "This is a breaking news special report" or "This is a special breaking news report" or "This is a(n) (network name) News Special Report" or "This is a(n) (station brand name) breaking news (special) report" or "(From [station brand name],) this is breaking news." The breaking news ending has a past-tense variation, followed by a disclaimer for viewers who would like more information to see the network's news division website. As of late 2019, ABC updated its breaking news lower third to include the words "breaking news" and the words "special report" together.

However, "special report" has also been de-emphasized by cable news channels in the United States, as both Fox News Channel and CNN now use that phrase for regular programming; Fox News carries Special Report with Bret Baier, a daily political affairs program (it had launched in 1998 as a special hour summing up the day's events during the lead up to and coverage of the Clinton impeachment proceedings, eventually becoming a permanent title and misnomer), while CNN's Special Report is a catch-all banner for CNN's library documentary and true crime programming.

Criticism
In early coverage of a breaking story, details are commonly sketchy, usually due to the limited information that is available at the time. For example, during the Sago Mine disaster, there were initial reports that all twelve miners were found alive, but news organizations later learned that only one actually survived.

Often it is considered important to be quick with news bulletins also for less important news. Such news might not be updated later, even if it was found that information was wrong or severely incomplete. If someone (e.g. when editing Wikipedia) later wants to research the event, only incomplete information might be found.

Another criticism has been the dilution of the sense of the term by the need of 24-hour news channels to fill time, applying the title to soft news stories of questionable importance and urgency (for example, car chases). They often fill time waiting for a story to 'break' with commentary. The term is often redundant, as all news is by definition breaking, and in some ways 'breaking news' means 'no news yet'.

Others question as to whether the use of the term is excessive, citing occasions when the term is used even though scheduled programming is not interrupted. For example, when an evening broadcast begins with "Breaking news as we come on the air" to cover a story that has been covered by other broadcasts repetitively within the last 24 hours. Some programs, such as HLN's defunct Nancy Grace, used the term for recurring coverage of events which occurred months before, even when criminal trial coverage which may deserve the breaking news tag was not occurring and no new information has developed.

In June 2013, Fox affiliate WDRB in Louisville, Kentucky gained notice in the television industry for a promo that criticized the broad and constant use of the "breaking news" term, explaining that it has been overused as a "marketing ploy" by other news-producing stations, who tend to apply the term to stories that are low in urgency or relevance. To coincide with the promo, on its website, WDRB posted "Contracts" with its viewers and advertisers, with the former list promising to use "breaking news" judiciously (applying it to stories that are "both 'breaking' and 'news'").

In June 2022, CNN chief Chris Licht oversaw the addition of guidance regarding the use of "breaking news" to the network's style guide. Licht, who took over leadership after the recent merger of its parent company WarnerMedia with Discovery Inc., argued in an internal memo that overuse of the term by news channels had made it lose its impact among viewers, and that "We are truth-tellers, focused on informing, not alarming our viewers."

See also

 Live television
 News agency
 Press conference
 Stop press

References

Local news programming in the United States
News

ja:報道特別番組